Sheila Marie Cornell-Douty (born February 26, 1962) is an American, two-time Gold Medal winning Olympian and former collegiate right-handed softball first basemen, originally from Woodland Hills, California. Cornell-Douty won two National Championships with the UCLA Bruins in 1982 and 1984. After graduating from UCLA she played for the Stratford Brakettes from 1988 through 1994. She also competed at the 1996 Summer Olympics in Atlanta where she received a gold medal with the American team. She was also a member of the American gold winning team at the 2000 Summer Olympics in Sydney.  She was inducted into the National Softball Hall of Fame and Museum in 2006, and the International Softball Federation Hall of Fame in 2007.

Statistics

UCLA Bruins

Team USA

References

External links
 
 
 

1962 births
Living people
UCLA Bruins softball players
Olympic softball players of the United States
Olympic gold medalists for the United States in softball
Softball players at the 1996 Summer Olympics
Softball players at the 2000 Summer Olympics
Medalists at the 1996 Summer Olympics
Medalists at the 2000 Summer Olympics
People from Encino, Los Angeles
Softball players from California